Capsanthin is a natural red dye of the xanthophyll class of carotenoids. As a food coloring, it has the E number E160c(i).  Capsanthin is the main carotenoid in the Capsicum annuum species of plants including red bell pepper, New Mexico chile, and cayenne peppers (Capsicum annuum) and a component of paprika oleoresin. Capsanthin is also found in some species of lily. Among other carotenoids, capsanthin is considered to have the greatest antioxidant capacity due to the presence of eleven conjugated double bonds, a conjugated keto group, and a cyclopentane ring.

Health benefits 
Xanthophyllic carotenoids like beta-carotene, lutein, and zeaxanthin have often been touted for their ability to help eye functionality. Capsanthin is also able to support eye health and recent research has revealed its unique ability to help maintain intraocular pressure within a healthy range. A clinical study on Wistar rats explored this effect over the course of 28 days. The rats were induced with higher intraocular pressure and then either given a placebo or capsanthin. At the end of the trial, rats that consumed capsanthin had normalized their eye pressure comparable to the control group that had normal pressure levels.

Because capsanthin's health benefits have only been discovered recently, the availability of purchasing the ingredient within a dietary supplement is still quite limited. It is currently only supplied by Unibar Corporation as CapsiClear and can be found within two supplements: "Health Thru Nutrition: Capsanthin" and "DouleuRx CapsiClear".

References

Carotenoids